Federation Internationale de Savate (Federation Internationale de Savate) is the world governing body for the sport of Savate. The organization is dedicated to the promotion of the sport of savate and canne de combat. It currently has 63 member countries. The organization holds biannual World and Continental championships, while their member countries hold national competitions.

History
During the 1880s and 1890s Joseph Charlemont and Lois Albert synthesized the various savate methods and moves and created the „academic style“ of the sports, but were opposed to adjusting it to fit the modern demands of the sport. By 1944 there were two separate views of the sport of savate: the white collar practitioners who were in favor of full contact ring fighting, and the academically oriented practitioners who opposed this.

In 1965 the „Comité National de Boxe Francaisé“ was founded. The two philosophies competed for control of the organization. In 1973 CNBF became the „Fédéeration Nationale de Boxe Francaise“ under the control of the academic camp. Their opponents founded a new organization, the „Fédéeration Nationale de Savate-Boxe-Francaise“. In 1976 the French government gave the official teaching rights to the academic camp.

In March of 1985 the two camps came together to found the “Fédération Internationale de Boxe Française Savate", which was renamed to Fédération Internationale de Savate in October of 1999.

Structure
All 63 member countries affiliated with Federation Internationale de Savate hold voting power in the General Assembly, which is held every two years. An extraordinary meeting of the general assembly may be called by the board of directors or it may be requested by 3/4 of the member countries. 

At the meeting of the General Assembly management reports are presented, and discussion is held concerning the financial and legal situation of the organization. The General Assembly is the body that votes the president into power and which chooses its board of directors. 

The organization itself if administered by the board of directors, who are a president, one or two vice-presidents, a Secretary General, a Treasurer, and a number of other persons who make up 20 members of the board of directors.

Rules and techniques
In savate only strikes with the fists and foot kicks are allowed, unlike kickboxing or muay thai which allow strikes with knees and shins as well.

Presidents
 Jean-Marie Rousseau 1985–1989
 Alain Salomon 1989–1992
 Michel Roger 1992–2001
 Alexandre Walnier 2001–2003
 Jean Houel 2003–2007
 Gilles Le Duigou 2007–2010
 Julie Gabriel 2010–

World Championships

2019 World Championship
The 2019 World Championship qualifications were held in Hammamet, Tunisia. The Championship itself was held in Hammamet, Milan, Vandoeuvre, La Motte-Servolex, Perpignan, Dakar and Tunis. Both the male and female fighters competed across eight different weight categories.

2017 World Championship
The 2017 World Championship qualification was held in Varaždin, Croatia. The Championship itself was held in Martinique, Vandoeuvre, La Motte-Servolex, Hangzhou and Toulouse. Male fighters competed across eight weight classes and female fighters competed across seven weight classes.

2015 World Championship
The World Championship qualifications were held in La Roche-sur-Yon, France. The Championship itself was held in Martinique, Saint Petersburg, Vandoeuvre and Amiens.

2013 World Championship
The 2013 Male World Championships were held in Clermont-Ferrand, France, while the Female World Championships were held in both Clermont-Ferrand and Hainan, China. Men competed across eight, and women across seven weight classes.

2011 World Championship
The 2011 Male World Championships were held in Milan, Italy, across eight weight classes.

See also

 Savate
 Canne de combat

References

External links
 
 

International sports organizations
Savate
Martial arts organizations